Ugo Nastasi (born 16 April 1993) is a French–Luxembourgish tennis player.

Nastasi has a career high ATP singles ranking of 656 achieved on 28 September 2015. He also has a career high ATP doubles ranking of 697, also achieved on 28 September 2015. 
 
Nastasi has represented Luxembourg at Davis Cup, where he has a win–loss record of 12–15, including a 5-set win against Casper Ruud from Norway.

ATP Challenger and ITF Futures/World Tennis Tour finals

Doubles: 6 (0–6)

External links 
 
 
 

1993 births
Living people
Luxembourgian male tennis players
French male tennis players
People from Thionville
People from Longwy
Sportspeople from Meurthe-et-Moselle
Sportspeople from Moselle (department)